The 2022 Montana State Bobcats football team represented Montana State University as a member of the Big Sky Conference during the 2022 NCAA Division I FCS football season. The Bobcats were led by second-year head coach Brent Vigen and played their home games at Bobcat Stadium in Bozeman, Montana.

Previous season
The Bobcats finished the 2021 FCS season with a 9–2 record (7–1 in conference), losing only to Wyoming (an FBS team) and Montana. They were seeded eighth in the FCS postseason tournament and received a first-round bye; they then defeated UT Martin, Sam Houston State, and South Dakota State to advance to the final match of the tournament. In the championship game, the Bobcats were defeated by North Dakota State on January 8, 2022, in Frisco, Texas.

Preseason

Polls
On July 25, 2022, during the virtual Big Sky Kickoff, the Bobcats were predicted to finish third in the Big Sky by the coaches and second by the media.

Preseason All–Big Sky team
The Bobcats had seven players selected to the preseason all-Big Sky team.

Offense

Tommy Mellott – QB

Isaiah Ifanse – RB

R.J. Fitzgerald – WR

Defense

Brody Grebe – DE

Callahan O'Reilly – ILB

Special teams

Bryce Leighton – P

Tommy Sullivan – LS

Roster

Schedule

Game summaries

McNeese State

Morehead State

at Oregon State

at No. 15 Eastern Washington

UC Davis

Idaho State

at Northern Colorado

No. 5 Weber State

at Northern Arizona

at Cal Poly

No. 13 Montana

FCS Playoffs

No. 9 Weber State – Second Round

No. 6 William & Mary – Quarterfinals

at No. 1 South Dakota State – Semifinals

Ranking movements

References

Montana State
Montana State Bobcats football seasons
Big Sky Conference football champion seasons
Montana State
Montana State Bobcats football